Montrose W. Morris (March 20, 1861 – April 14, 1916) was an American architect from Brooklyn best known for some of the first multi-unit apartment buildings in New York City. His most well-known buildings include the Alhambra Apartments, Imperial Apartments, and the Renaissance Apartments all in Brooklyn, New York. Most of Morris’ work still stands adding greatly to the borough's architectural heritage. Morris worked in the prevalent architectural styles of the period, including Queen Anne and Romanesque Revival.

Life and education
Morris was born in Hempstead, Long Island on March 20, 1861. His family later moved to Brooklyn and he was educated at the Peekskill Academy. In 1876, he became an apprentice to Manhattan architect Charles W. Clinton, who, in concert with his partner, Hamilton Russell, was responsible for some of New York's most iconic buildings, including the Seventh Regiment Armory, the Graham Court Apartments, and the Masonic Temple (now the New York City Center). Morris was a veteran of Company H, 23rd Regiment, N.G., S.N.Y., a member of Grant Post and the Mistletoe Lodge No. 647, F.&A.M., of Lefferts Council, Royal Acanum, of the Union League Club and Montauk Club of Brooklyn, and the New England Society. He had two sons, Raymond M. and LeRoy C., who worked in his architectural practice starting in 1911; they carried on the firm in their father's name after his early death.

Career
Morris opened his architectural office in 1883 in his early 20s. He advertised his services by designing and building his own residence on Hancock Street between Marcy and Tompkins Avenues in the Bedford Stuyvesant district, and then opened it to the public. One of the visitors was developer Louis F. Seitz, who later commissioned three apartment buildings from Morris.

Morris’ apartment buildings are among the earliest built in Brooklyn. During the 19th century, single-family row houses were the residential homes of choice for the middle class. Apartments or “flathouses” were considered inferior and there was a distinct prejudice against them. Only toward the end of the century did it become socially acceptable for the middle class to live in an apartment house. The high-quality of the design and richness of materials Morris used were intended to attract middle-class families.

Morris’ most productive years came in tge two decades between 1885 and 1905. His most important works are located in all the most desirable Brooklyn neighborhoods: Brooklyn Heights, Fort Greene, Clinton Hill, Park Slope, and Bedford Stuyvesant.

Death and legacy
Morris died in his home from unstated causes on April 14, 1916, at age 55.

Many of his buildings survive today. And through efforts of the communities around them, they have been preserved. While Morris doesn't have the largest body of work from that time, his stand out for their innovative use of massing, shapes, materials, ornament, design elements, loggias, balconies and the unique way he combined all these elements.

Work
 232 Hancock Street, Brooklyn, New York, 1886
 236-244 Hancock Street, Brooklyn, 1886
 246-252 Hancock Street, Brooklyn, 1880s
 Northside Savings Bank, Brooklyn, 1889
 282-290 DeKalb Avenue, Brooklyn, 1889 
 285-289 DeKalb Avenue, Brooklyn, 1889
 Alhambra Apartments, Brooklyn, 1889–90
 109 S 9th Street, Brooklyn, 1890
 William H. Beard House, 186 Clinton Avenue, Brooklyn, 1891 
 Clermont Apartments, 79-81 Decatur Street, Brooklyn, 1891
 Imperial Apartments, Brooklyn, 1892
 Renaissance Apartments, Brooklyn, 1892
 Poly Prep Lower School - Henry Hulbert House, Brooklyn, 1892
 186 Clinton Avenue, Brooklyn, 1905
 315 Clinton Avenue, Brooklyn, 1890
 515 Clinton Avenue, Brooklyn, 1893-4
 Clarence Walker Seamens residence, Brooklyn, 1900–03
 143-53 Eighth Avenue, Brooklyn, 1910–11
 Chatelaine Hotel, 1350 Bedford Avenue, Brooklyn, 1915-16

References

External links
 

1861 births
1916 deaths
19th-century American architects
People from Brooklyn